"Boys" is a single by English singer Charli XCX, released on 26 July 2017 by Asylum Records and Atlantic Records UK. The song was originally intended to be the second single from her then-upcoming third studio album. However, the song became a stand-alone single when the projected third album was leaked on the internet and cancelled. The song makes use of a sample from the Nintendo video game Super Mario Bros.

A cover of the song by one of its writers, Ingrid Andress, is included on the deluxe edition reissue of Andress' debut studio album, Lady Like (2020), with a mandolin being used to replicate the video game sample.

Critical reception
"Boys" received positive reviews. Pitchfork named the song the 'Best New Track', and in a review contributor Eve Barlow wrote that "Boys" is "deceptively simple-sounding and unfussy," and "a reminder that [Charli XCX is] one of the best at knowing how to have fun; her convivial bop sounds as effortless as something dreamed up between lunch and dinner." The track was placed on several magazines' best songs of the year lists.

Rankings

Music video
The music video for "Boys" was released on 26 July 2017. It was directed by Charli XCX, with additional direction from Sarah McColgan, and began production in April 2017. It features a multitude of different celebrity cameos from figures within the music, fashion and social media industries. It was filmed in London and Los Angeles. In an interview with BBC Radio 1, Charli XCX said that the intention of the music video was to "flip the male gaze on its head".

List of boys in order of appearance

Track listing
Digital download
"Boys" – 2:42

Digital download
"Boys" (Acoustic) – 2:55

Digital download
"Boys" (Coldabank Remix) – 3:56

Digital download
"Boys" (Droeloe Remix) – 3:36

Digital download
"Boys" (Nevada Remix) – 3:08

Digital Download — Remix EP
"Boys" (Droeloe Remix) – 3:36
"Boys" (Nevada Remix) – 3:08
"Boys" (Acoustic) – 2:55
"Boys" (Coldabank Remix) – 3:56

Credits and personnel
Taken from Tidal.
 Charli XCX – lead vocals
 Jerker Hansson – songwriting, production
 Cass Lowe – songwriting, production 
 Emily Warren – songwriting
 Ingrid Andress – songwriting
 Michael Pollack – songwriting
 Ari Leff – songwriting

Charts

Certifications

References

2017 singles
2017 songs
Asylum Records singles
Atlantic Records singles
Charli XCX songs
Song recordings produced by Stargate (record producers)
Songs about casual sex
Songs written by Cass Lowe
Songs written by Charli XCX
Songs written by Emily Warren
Songs written by Lauv
Songs written by Michael Pollack (musician)
Songs written by Ingrid Andress